Microblepsis rugosa is a moth in the family Drepanidae. It was described by Watson in 1968. It is found in the Naga Hills of north-eastern India and in Malaysia.

The length of the forewings is 12–18 mm.

References

Moths described in 1968
Drepaninae